In graph theory, toughness is a measure of the connectivity of a graph.  A graph  is said to be -tough for a given real number  if, for every integer ,  cannot be split into  different connected components by the removal of fewer than  vertices. For instance, a graph is -tough if the number of components formed by removing a set of vertices is always at most as large as the number of removed vertices. The toughness of a graph is the maximum  for which it is -tough; this is a finite number for all finite graphs except the complete graphs, which by convention have infinite toughness.

Since then there has been extensive work by other mathematicians on toughness; the recent survey by  lists 99 theorems and 162 papers on the subject.

Examples
Removing  vertices from a path graph can split the remaining graph into as many as  connected components. The maximum ratio of components to removed vertices is achieved by removing one vertex (from the interior of the path) and splitting it into two components. Therefore, paths are -tough. In contrast, removing  vertices from a cycle graph leaves at most  remaining connected components, and sometimes leaves exactly  connected components, so a cycle is -tough.

Connection to vertex connectivity
If a graph is -tough, then one consequence (obtained by setting ) is that any set of  nodes can be removed without splitting the graph in two. That is, every -tough graph is also -vertex-connected.

Connection to Hamiltonicity

 observed that every cycle, and therefore every Hamiltonian graph, is -tough; that is, being -tough is a necessary condition for a graph to be Hamiltonian. He conjectured that the connection between toughness and Hamiltonicity goes in both directions: that there exists a threshold  such that every -tough graph is Hamiltonian. The existence of a larger toughness threshold for Hamiltonicity remains open, and is sometimes called Chvátal's toughness conjecture.

Computational complexity
Testing whether a graph is -tough is co-NP-complete. That is, the decision problem whose answer is "yes" for a graph that is not 1-tough, and "no" for a graph that is 1-tough, is NP-complete. The same is true for any fixed positive rational number : testing whether a graph is -tough is co-NP-complete .

See also
Strength of a graph, an analogous concept for edge deletions
Tutte–Berge formula, a related characterization of the size of a maximum matching in a graph

References 
.
.
.
.

Graph connectivity
Graph invariants